"Electrify" is a song by British DJ and producer Jakwob from his upcoming debut studio album. The song, lyrics written by Rocky Nti, James Jacob and Steve 'Dub' Jones was released as a single on 2 March 2012 as a digital download in the United Kingdom. It features vocals from Jetta, and incorporates sample replays of Indian music recreated by UK producer Mark Summers of SCORCCiO Sample Replays.

Music video
A music video to accompany the release of "Electrify" was first released onto YouTube on 23 January 2012 at a total length of three minutes and forty-six seconds.

Track listing

Chart performance

Release history

References

2012 singles
Jakwob songs
2011 songs